Harpalus cordifer is a species of ground beetle in the subfamily Harpalinae. It was described by Notman in 1919.

References

cordifer
Beetles described in 1919